The LXXVIII Army Corps for special deployment was a short-lived army corps of the German Wehrmacht during World War II. It was formed in early March 1944 and dissolved just under three months later. Its personnel was used for the formation of the I Cavalry Corps.

History 
The LXXVIII Army Corps z. b. V. was formed on 6 March 1944 in Trautenau in Wehrkreis VIII. It was initially transferred to the 4th Romanian Army fighting in Bessarabia under the supervision of Army Group South Ukraine, but was called off to join the Replacement Army at Truppenübungsplatz Demba on 30 April 1944.

The LXXVIII Army Corps z. b. V. was dissolved on 25 May 1944 and its personnel largely used to form the I Cavalry Corps.

Structure

References 

Corps of Germany in World War II
Military units and formations established in 1944
Military units and formations disestablished in 1944